This article is a discography for American singer Rudy Vallée.

Studio albums

Singles

References 
The Online 78 rpm Discographical Project

Pop music discographies
Discographies of American artists